Tony Dwayne Harris (born May 13, 1967) is a retired American professional basketball player. After spending high school at Roosevelt in East Chicago, he later went to University of New Orleans.

Professional career
Harris debuted in the NBA in February 1991 for the Philadelphia 76ers in the 1990–91 season, averaging 1.7 points on 25.0% field goal shooting and 50.0% free throw shooting in 6.8 minutes a game in 6 contests.

In 1994, Tony Harris played for the Boston Celtics for two seasons. In March 1994, he had his best season with averages of 8.8 points, 2.0 rebounds, 1.6 assists and 1.2 turnovers on 17.6 minutes in 5 games.  He finished his NBA career with an average of 4.9 points on 10.5 minutes in fourteen contests.

Tony Harris scored 105 points in a game on October 10, 1992, in the Philippine Basketball Association, against Ginebra in a game that was played in Iloilo City. To this day his record still stands. Fans gave him the moniker "Hurricane" in the Philippine Basketball Association.

NBA career statistics

Regular season

|-
| align="left" | 1990–91
| align="left" | Philadelphia
| 6 || 0 || 6.8 || .250 || .000 || .500 || .2 || .0 || .2 || .0 || 1.7
|-
| align="left" | 1993–94
| align="left" | Boston
| 5 || 0 || 17.6 || .290 || .333 || .920 || 2.0 || .0 || .8 || .0 || 8.8
|-
| align="left" | 1994–95
| align="left" | Boston
| 3 || 0 || 6.0 || .375 || .000 || .889 || .0 || .0 || .0 || .0 || 4.7
|-
| align="left" | Career
| align="left" | 
| 14 || 0 || 10.5 || .291 || .250 || .868 || .8 || .6 || .4 || .0 || 4.9

References

External links 
 

1967 births
Living people
American expatriate basketball people in Cyprus
American expatriate basketball people in Greece
American expatriate basketball people in the Philippines
American expatriate basketball people in Spain
American expatriate basketball people in Venezuela
American men's basketball players
APOEL B.C. players
Basketball players from Louisiana
Boston Celtics players
Cocodrilos de Caracas players
Grand Rapids Hoops players
Johnson County Community College people
Junior college men's basketball players in the United States
La Crosse Catbirds players
Lamar Cardinals basketball players
Liga ACB players
New Orleans Privateers men's basketball players
Oklahoma City Cavalry players
Papagou B.C. players
Philadelphia 76ers players
Philippine Basketball Association imports
Point guards
Pop Cola Panthers players
Quad City Thunder players
San Diego Stingrays players
Sioux Falls Skyforce (CBA) players
Sportspeople from East Chicago, Indiana
Sportspeople from Monroe, Louisiana
Undrafted National Basketball Association players